Bruce Falson (born April 17, 1975), better known by his stage name Blood Raw, is a black American rapper. He was part of the Atlanta-based rap-group U.S.D.A. until 2010.

His debut album, My Life: The True Testimony, peaked at number 5 on the Billboard Top R&B/Hip-Hop Albums chart and reached number 29 on the Billboard 200.

Discography

2008: My Life: The True Testimony

References

External links
Blood Raw on Myspace

1981 births
Living people
African-American male rappers
American male rappers
People from Panama City, Florida
Rappers from Atlanta
Rappers from Florida
Southern hip hop musicians
21st-century American rappers
21st-century American male musicians
21st-century African-American musicians
20th-century African-American people